The Chief Justice of the Federal Shariat Court of Pakistan heads the Federal Shariat Court of Pakistan. The Chief Justice of the Shariat Court is the second-highest judicial office in the country, after the Chief Justice of Pakistan. 

The Acting Chief Justice of Federal Shariat Court of Pakistan is Hon'ble Mr. Justice Dr. Syed Muhammad Anwer, who took oath on 16 May 2022.

List of Chief Justices
These are the names of the Chief Justices of the Federal Shariat Court of Pakistan, which came into being in 1980.

List of Sitting Judges of Federal Shariat Court
 Hon'ble Mr. Justice Dr. Syed Muhammad Anwer, Acting Chief Justice Federal Shariat Court of Pakistan
 Khadim Hussain M. Shaikh, Judge

References

Pakistani judges
Judiciary of Pakistan
Islam in Pakistan
Chief justices of the Federal Shariat Court